Eupithecia seditiosa is a moth in the family Geometridae. It is found in Nepal.

References

Moths described in 1981
seditiosa
Moths of Asia